is a Japanese arcade game by Takara Tomy Arts. It is the successor to Pretty Rhythm, PriPara, Idol Time PriPara, Kiratto Pri☆Chan and the fourth entry in Takara Tomy's Pretty Series.

Plot
"PriMagi", is a form of entertainment that is created through song, dance, and fashion, where aspiring, up-and-coming idols can performs as a "Primagista"! There is a secret to the magical, sparkling stage. Yes, it was truly indeed "magic"!

Matsuri Hibino, is a first year junior high school student who loves "PriMagi" and dreams of one day participating in it. And that's when the magician "Myamu" suddenly appears and scouts her out to join "PriMagi"!! The two of them work together and aim to reach the top of "Primagista" so they can defeat against their rivals!

Characters

Game characters

Playable characters 

A bright, lively and free-spirited first year junior high school student who loves PriMagi and festivals. When she performs as a Primagista, she's immediately able to unleash a great amount of magic. She is very driven to become a top Primagista. Her preferred brand is LOVELY MELODY. Her birthday is on August 8th.

A stylish and energetic third-year junior high school student at Arawashi School, a powerful school for Primagistas. She lost to Jennifer during the previous PriMagi Grand Festival but she's trying her hardest to beat her. Her preferred brand is VIVID STAR.

A shy but knowledgeable second-year junior high school student who is an aspiring PriMagi otaku. Her preferred brand is Radiant Abyss.

A deceptively cute second-year junior high school student. She acts cute but in reality she is mischievous and tries to sabotage Matsuri and Myamu on multiple occasions. She is intimidated by Hina. Her dream is to build a Milky Cute Museum. Her preferred brand is Cherry Sugar.

An elegant and talented third-year junior high school student whom the younger students respect. Her preferred brand is Eternal Revue.

A genius child prodigy. She knows a great deal about mechanics and technology, Auru greatly values efficiency and research data, and as a result, her words and decisions may come off as cold or blunt. Her preferred brand is ELECTRO REMIX.

She was the winner of the previous PriMagi Grand Festival and a high-class Primagista whom Matsuri admires. She is passionate and fabulous, often acts like a celebrity. She holds great love for PriMagi. Her preferred brand is SHINING DIVA.

Partner characters 

Matsuri's magician partner who struggles to control her incredible magic abilities. She is very supportive, competitive and fears abandonment. She can assume the form of a light blue kitten. Her preferred brand is LOVELY MELODY. She also shares her birthday with Matsuri.

Hina's magician partner.

Lemon's magician partner.

Miruki's magician partner.

Amane's magician partner.

Auru's owl-like robot partner.

Anime-only characters 

Matsuri's childhood friend. As her friend, he cares deeply for her, and he always tries his best to support her in her troubled times.

A mysterious blue wolf who appears to know Myamu. He seems to be capricious and playful, often teasing Toma and Myamu. However, he deeply loves Primagi.

Jennifer's magician partner.

Auru's father who is the CEO of the Omega Corporation.

Auru's assistant who works at the Omega Corporation.

Media

Arcade game
PriMagi arcade game were launched on October 1, 2021. It was developed by syn Sophia and published by Takara Tomy. A player can create a character and progress by performing live shows.

Anime

Manga
A manga adaptation by Hitsuji Tsujinaga began serialization in Shogakukan's shōjo manga magazine Ciao in September 2021.

References

2021 anime television series debuts
2021 video games
Japanese idols in anime and manga
Magical girl anime and manga
Sentai Filmworks
Shogakukan manga
Shōjo manga
Tatsunoko Production
TV Tokyo original programming
Video games about magic